The 1994 Ice Hockey World Junior Championship (1994 WJC) was the 18th edition of the Ice Hockey World Junior Championship and was held in Ostrava and Frydek-Mistek, Czech Republic. Canada won the gold medal for the second consecutive year, and its seventh overall, while Sweden won silver, and Russia the bronze.

Final standings
The 1994 tournament was a round-robin format, with the top three teams winning gold, silver and bronze medals respectively.

Switzerland was relegated to Pool B for 1995.

Results

Scoring leaders

Tournament awards

Pool B
Eight teams contested the second tier this year in Bucharest, Romania from December 27 to January 5.  It was played in a simple round robin format, each team playing seven games.

Standings

Qualification for Pool C
A Qualification tournament was played in Nitra and Nové Zámky, Slovakia, from November 1 to 7.  Games between teams that had played each other in the preliminary round carried forward and counted in the final round.

Preliminary round
Group A

Group B

Final Round
Group A

 and  won the right to participate in Pool C.

Pool C
Eight teams were divided into two round robin groups, with placement games to follow (1st played 1st, etc.).  The tournament took place from December 30 to January 3, in Odense and Esbjerg, Denmark.

Preliminary round
Group A

Group B

Placement Games
7th place: 7 - 2 
5th place: 11 - 1 
3rd place: 6 - 5 
1st Place: 6 - 2  was promoted to Pool B for 1995.''

References

 
1994 World Junior Hockey Championships at TSN
1994 results at Passionhockey.com

World Junior Ice Hockey Championships
Youth ice hockey in the Czech Republic
1993–94 in Czech ice hockey
December 1993 sports events in Europe
January 1994 sports events in Europe
Sport in Ostrava
Sport in Frýdek-Místek
International ice hockey competitions hosted by the Czech Republic
Sports competitions in Bucharest
1990s in Bucharest
International ice hockey competitions hosted by Romania
International ice hockey competitions hosted by Denmark
1993–94 in Danish ice hockey
Sport in Odense
Sport in Esbjerg
1993–94 in Romanian ice hockey